Chuac Lun Football Club, simply known as Chuac Lun is a football team based in Macau S.A.R., China. Currently, Chuac Lun plays in the Liga de Elite, previously known as Campeonato da 1ª Divisão do Futebol, organized by the Associação de Futebol de Macau.

Current squad
	
Season 2016.

References

Football clubs in Macau